Brunilde (or Brunhilde) Bianchi (born 22 December 1964 in Pavullo nel Frignano) is an Italian ice dancing coach, choreographer, and former competitor. With Valter Rizzo, she competed at two European Championships, placing 20th in 1984 (Budapest, Hungary) and 13th in 1985 (Gothenburg, Sweden).

Bianchi began coaching in 1988 in Rome. Her students have included Federica Faiella / Massimo Scali, Alessia Aureli / Andrea Vaturi, Isabella Pajardi / Stefano Caruso, Sofia Sforza / Francesco Fioretti, and Sara Ghislandi / Giona Terzo Ortenzi. As of 2016, she is listed as a Level 3 coach by the Italian ice sports federation (FISG) and is based at S.S.D. S.r.l. Icelab in Bergamo.

Bianchi and Valter Rizzo are the parents of Italian skater Matteo Rizzo.

References 

1964 births
Figure skating coaches
Italian female ice dancers
Living people
Sportspeople from Bergamo
Sportspeople from the Province of Modena
20th-century Italian women
21st-century Italian women